Melanocercops is a genus of moths in the family Gracillariidae.

Species
Melanocercops cyclopa (Meyrick, 1908)
Melanocercops desiccata (Meyrick, 1916)
Melanocercops elaphopa (Meyrick, 1914)
Melanocercops ficuvorella (Yazaki, 1926)
Melanocercops melanommata (Turner, 1913)
Melanocercops phractopa (Meyrick, 1918)

External links
Global Taxonomic Database of Gracillariidae (Lepidoptera)

Acrocercopinae
Gracillarioidea genera